Prenatal sex discernment is the prenatal testing for discerning the sex of a fetus before birth.

Methods
Prenatal sex discernment can be performed by preimplantation genetic diagnosis before conception, but this method may not always be classified as prenatal sex discernment because it's performed even before implantation.

Cell-free fetal DNA testing, wherein a venipuncture is performed on the mother to analyze the small amount of fetal DNA that can be found within it. It provides the earliest post-implantation test. A meta-analysis published in 2011 found that such tests are reliable more than 98% of the time, as long as they are taken after the seventh week of pregnancy.
Chorionic villus sampling (CVS) and amniocentesis are two rather invasive testing procedures. These may, in principle, be performed as early as the 8th and the 9th week of pregnancy. The difficulty of these tests and the risk of injury to the foetus, potentially resulting in miscarriage or congenital abnormalities (especially when done early during the pregnancy), make them quite rare during the first trimester. In the United States, CVS and amniocentesis are most commonly performed after the 11th and the 15th week of pregnancy.
Obstetric ultrasonography, either transvaginally or transabdominally, can check for the sagittal sign as a marker of foetal sex. Accuracy for males is approximately 50% and for females almost 100%. When performed later, after 70 days from fertilization (at week 13 of gestational age), it gives an accurate result in almost 100% of cases.

Applications
Potential applications of prenatal sex discernment include:
Disease testing: A complement to specific gene testing for monogenic disorders, which can be very useful for genetic diseases with sex linkage, such as, for example, X-linked diseases. In such cases, it may be much easier to exclude the possibility of disease in the child by prenatal sex discernment than to test for any specific sign of the disease itself. Common X-linked recessive disorders include Duchenne muscular dystrophy, fragile X syndrome and haemophilia.
Preparation, for any sex-dependent aspects of parenting. 
Sex selection, which after preimplantation genetic diagnosis may be performed by selecting only embryos of the preferred sex, or, after post-implantation methods by performing sex-selective abortion depending on the test result and personal preference. A 2006 survey  found that 42 per cent of IVF clinics in the US that offer PGD have provided it for sex selection for non-medical reasons. Nearly half of these clinics perform it only for "family balancing", which is where a couple with two or more children of one sex desire a child of the other, but half do not restrict sex selection to family balancing. In India, this practice has been used to select only male embryos although this practice is illegal. Opinions on whether sex selection for non-medical reasons is ethically acceptable differ widely, as exemplified by the fact that the European Society of Human Reproduction and Embryology Task Force could not formulate a uniform recommendation.

Legal status

India

 Prenatal sex determination was banned in India in 1994, under the Pre-Conception and Pre-Natal Diagnostic Techniques Act, 1994. The act aims to prevent sex-selective abortion, which, according to the Indian Ministry of Health and Family Welfare, "has its roots in India's long history of strong patriarchal influence in all spheres of life". Prenatal sex determination has caused the Child sex ratio to go down at alarming rates, in India, which is also another factor that led to its banning. However, the Supreme Court of India has accused the Government of India of poor implementation and enforcement of the act. Over time, there has been a substitution effect of more families participating in pre-natal sex determination instead of the previously popular act of female foeticide.

China

On May 1, 2016, sex determination and sex-selective abortion were prohibited. Doctors are forbidden by the state from revealing the sex of unborn babies in an effort to stop prospective parents from finding out the gender of their child and potentially abort or abandon babies.

See also
Gender reveal, a celebration party
Female infanticide, a practice widespread throughout many cultures and times
Gendercide

References